Tetrakis(trimethylsilyloxy)silane (TTMS) is an organosilicon compound with the formula Si[OSi(CH3)3]4.  This colourless liquid is used as a reagent in organic synthesis.

Application
TTMS can be used for thin film coating with a nanostructured silicon dioxide prepared by plasma-enhanced chemical vapor deposition (PECVD) at atmospheric pressure.

References

Siloxanes
Trimethylsilyl compounds